Litten is a surname. Notable people with the surname include:

Derren Litten (born 1970), English comedy writer
Friedrich Litten (1873–1940), German jurist
Hans Litten (1903–1938), German lawyer
Irmgard Litten (1879–1953), German writer
Moritz Litten (1845–1907), German physician
Litten's sign
Peter Litten (born 1960), English film director